Lycieae is a tribe of flowering plants in the subfamily Solanoideae of the family Solanaceae. It comprises two genera: Lycium and Grabowskia.

References

Solanoideae
Asterid tribes